Birkirkara F.C. is the women's team of the Maltese football club Birkirkara F.C., based in Birkirkara, Malta.

As of 2021–22, they are the tenth-time champions of the Maltese First Division.

Titles 
Maltese First Division 
 Champions (10):
2006-2007, 2008-2009, 2009-2010, 2011-2012, 2012-2013, 2016-2017, 2017-2018, 2018-19, 2019-20, 2021-22
 Cup winners (16)
1998-1999, 1999-2000, 2001-2002, 2002-2003, 2004-2005, 2006-2007, 2007-2008, 2008-2009, 2009-2010, 2010-2011, 2012-2013, 2013-2014, 2016-2017, 2017-18, 2018-19, 2019-20

References

External links
Birkirkara F.C. Women's Team

Women
Women's football clubs in Malta